Velocity Energy-efficient and Link-aware Cluster-Tree (VELCT) is a cluster and tree-based topology management protocol for mobile wireless sensor networks (MWSNs).

See also
 DCN
 DCT 
 CIDT

References

Topology
Wireless networking